Dariush Salehpour (also Romanized as Dāriūsh Sālehpūr, ; born 1980 in Tehran), né Mohsen Salehpour, is an Iranian composer, pianist, keyboardist, guitarist, and arranger. He is the creator and leader of the electronic jazz band “Zarbofoot” (which means “beat and blow” in Persian).

Salehpour is a graduate in computer software from Azad University. He spontaneously started playing the keyboard and the piano when he was only six years old. His talent was discovered by Arman Nahrvar in 1995, during a little performance at the Faculty of Economics in Allameh Tabatabai University, which marked his career. Next year Mohsen learned how to play the guitar and then he took up the electric guitar. In 1999 Salehpour and two friends of his, namely Sohrab Ramezanzadeh and Kaveh Ramezanzadeh, formed a rock band named “Piccolo” who, accompanied by Sara Naini, made performances in Tehran. It was about that time that Salehpour made friends with Reza Tajbakhsh and Alireza Miraqa. In 2001 the first piece arranged by Salehpour for Ruzbeh Nematollahi named “If You Were Not” was formally released.

Since then he has been seriously busy arranging and composing, producing many works in pop, electronic, and rock genres.

Dariush Salehpour has also worked as a guitarist and electronic artist with Shahram Shokoohi's orchestra. He had also a close relationship with Nima Varasteh as a partner.

Salehpour has a mixing and mastering (sound techniques) degree from the Australian company of “Vivid Sounds”.

During the COVID-19 pandemic,  Dariush Salehpour and Reza Tajbakhsh (Iranian singer), replayed and performed the musical piece "Way To Fall" along with James Walsh, the singer of the English Post-Britpop rock band,  Starsailor, which attracted the attention of the band's fans.

Works

Album 
 Plastic Garden, released 14 November 2019

Singles 

 Some of Salehpour's singles are as follow:

See also 

 Zarbofoot

References and footnotes

External links 

 Rial Song (Music-e Ma website)
 ماکان بند یک‌شبه ماکان بند نشده‌است (Iran Online website (Feb., 2018)
 Dariush Salehpour on Dideo
 Dariush Salehpour on My Rhythm website
 Dariush Salehpour on Aparat website (1)
 Dariush Salehpour on Aparat website (2)
 Dariush Salehpour on Ava-ye Farda website
 Kodoon.com
 Namanew website
 Dariush Salehpour on Facebook
 Dariush Salehpour on Instagram
 Dariush Salehpour on Nava website
 اجرای پژوهشیِ گروه ضرب و فوت برگزار می‌شود (Nava website (21 Jul., 2018)
 کنسرت گروه ضرب و فوت به مناسبت روز جهانی ایدز برگزار می‌شود (Nava website, 17 No., 2018)
 با حضور نوازندگان نام‌آشنا؛ اجرای پژوهشیِ گروه ضرب و فوت برگزار می‌شود (Ideal Music website)
 Dariush Salehpour on TilarMusic website
 Dariush Salehpour on insg.ir

21st-century pianists
21st-century composers
1980 births
Living people
Iranian composers
21st-century Iranian male singers
Musicians from Tehran
Iranian music arrangers